Actinostemon is a plant genus of the family Euphorbiaceae first described as a genus in 1841. It is native to South America, Central America, and the West Indies.

Species

formerly included
moved to other genera: Gymnanthes Sebastiania

References

Hippomaneae
Euphorbiaceae genera